Elastin is a protein that in humans is encoded by the ELN gene. Elastin is a key component of the extracellular matrix in gnathostomes (jawed vertebrates). It is highly elastic and present in connective tissue allowing many tissues in the body to resume their shape after stretching or contracting. Elastin helps skin to return to its original position when it is poked or pinched. Elastin is also an important load-bearing tissue in the bodies of vertebrates and used in places where mechanical energy is required to be stored.

Function 

The ELN gene encodes a protein that is one of the two components of elastic fibers. The encoded protein is rich in hydrophobic amino acids such as glycine and proline, which form mobile hydrophobic regions bounded by crosslinks between lysine residues. Multiple transcript variants encoding different isoforms have been found for this gene. Elastin's soluble precursor is tropoelastin. The characterization of disorder is consistent with an entropy-driven mechanism of elastic recoil. It is concluded that conformational disorder is a constitutive feature of elastin structure and function.

Clinical significance 
Deletions and mutations in this gene are associated with supravalvular aortic stenosis (SVAS) and the autosomal dominant cutis laxa. Other associated defects in elastin include Marfan syndrome, emphysema caused by α1-antitrypsin deficiency, atherosclerosis, Buschke-Ollendorff syndrome, Menkes syndrome, pseudoxanthoma elasticum, and Williams syndrome.

Elastosis
Elastosis is the buildup of elastin in tissues, and is a form of degenerative disease. There are a multitude of causes, but the most commons cause is actinic elastosis of the skin, also known as solar elastosis, which is caused by prolonged and excessive sun exposure, a process known as photoaging. Uncommon causes of skin elastosis include elastosis perforans serpiginosa, perforating calcific elastosis and linear focal elastosis.

Composition 

In the body, elastin is usually associated with other proteins in connective tissues. Elastic fiber in the body is a mixture of amorphous elastin and fibrous fibrillin. Both components are primarily made of smaller amino acids such as glycine, valine, alanine, and proline. The total elastin ranges from 58 to 75% of the weight of the dry defatted artery in normal canine arteries. Comparison between fresh and digested tissues shows that, at 35% strain, a minimum of 48% of the arterial load is carried by elastin, and a minimum of 43% of the change in stiffness of arterial tissue is due to the change in elastin stiffness.

Tissue distribution 
Elastin serves an important function in arteries as a medium for pressure wave propagation to help blood flow and is particularly abundant in large elastic blood vessels such as the aorta.  Elastin is also very important in the lungs, elastic ligaments, elastic cartilage, the skin, and the bladder. It is present in jawed vertebrates.

Characteristics 
Elastin is a very long-lived protein, with a half-life of over 78 years in humans.

Clinical research
The feasibility of using recombinant human tropoelastin to enable elastin fiber production to improve skin flexibility in wounds and scarring has been studied. After subcutaneous injections of recombinant human tropoelastin into fresh wounds it was found there was no improvement in scarring or the flexibility of the eventual scarring.

Biosynthesis

Tropoelastin precursors 
Elastin is made by linking together many small soluble precursor tropoelastin protein molecules (50-70 kDa), to make the final massive insoluble, durable complex. The unlinked tropoelastin molecules are not normally available in the cell, since they become crosslinked into elastin fibres immediately after their synthesis by the cell, after their export into the extracellular matrix.

Each tropoelastin consists of a string of 36 small domains, each weighing about 2 kDa in a random coil conformation. The protein consists of alternating hydrophobic and hydrophilic domains, which are encoded by separate exons, so that the domain structure of tropoelastin reflects the exon organization of the gene. The hydrophilic domains contain Lys-Ala (KA) and Lys-Pro (KP) motifs that are involved in crosslinking during the formation of mature elastin. In the KA domains, lysine residues occur as pairs or triplets separated by two or three alanine residues (e.g. AAAKAAKAA) whereas in KP domains the lysine residues are separated mainly by proline residues (e.g. KPLKP).

Aggregation 
Tropoelastin aggregates at physiological temperature due to interactions between hydrophobic domains in a process called coacervation. This process is reversible and thermodynamically controlled and does not require protein cleavage. The coacervate is made insoluble by irreversible crosslinking.

Crosslinking 
To make mature elastin fibres, the tropoelastin molecules are cross-linked via their lysine residues with desmosine and isodesmosine cross-linking molecules. The enzyme that performs the crosslinking is lysyl oxidase, using an in vivo Chichibabin pyridine synthesis reaction.

Molecular biology 

In mammals, the genome only contains one gene for tropoelastin, called ELN. The human ELN gene is a 45 kb segment on chromosome 7, and has 34 exons interrupted by almost 700 introns, with the first exon being a signal peptide assigning its extracellular localization. The large number of introns suggests that genetic recombination may contribute to the instability of the gene, leading to diseases such as SVAS. The expression of tropoelastin mRNA is highly regulated under at least eight different transcription start sites.

Tissue specific variants of elastin are produced by alternative splicing of the tropoelastin gene. There are at least 11 known human tropoelastin isoforms. these isoforms are under developmental regulation, however there are minimal differences among tissues at the same developmental stage.

See also 
Cutis laxa
Elastic fibers
Elastin receptor
Resilin: an invertebrate protein
Williams syndrome

References

Further reading

External links 
 
 
  GeneReviews/NIH/NCBI/UW entry on Williams or Williams-Beuren Syndrome
 The Elastin Protein
 Microfibril 

Aging-related proteins
Biomaterials
Elastomers
Extracellular matrix proteins
Structural proteins